Gerald McCarthy (born 1947) is a poet, best known for his spare, powerful meditations on his experiences as a marine in Vietnam. He is the recipient of awards from the National Writers Union and the New York State Council on the Arts, and has twice been a visiting artist at The American Academy in Rome. McCarthy was a professor of English at St. Thomas Aquinas College in Sparkill, New York.

Wartime experiences

As a 17-year-old marine, McCarthy served in Vietnam in 1966–7, unloading cargo from ships at FLSG-Bravo with the 1st Marines, after which he was transferred to the 1st Combat Engineer Battalion in Chu Lai and then Danang. After one tour, McCarthy deserted the military and did time in civilian jail and military prison. His early work, collected in War Story, is an unflinching yet understated meditation on his scarifying experiences in Vietnam. He remains a committed anti-war activist, and has participated in actions by Vets for Peace and Vietnam Veterans Against the War. McCarthy reflects on the brutalizing effects of the military experience in Bloody Hell: The Price Soldiers Pay
By Dan Hallock (Plough Publishing House, 1999), where he says, "Forget going to war...I wouldn't even go back to boot camp...I think it can change you psychologically forever."(p. 89)

Formative years

After his discharge, McCarthy worked as a stonecutter and shoe-factory worker. Fatefully, he decided to attend the University of Iowa Writers Workshop, a formative experience that helped shape his emerging voice as a poet, as did his time teaching writing at Attica Prison and in migrant labor camps, jails, and schools.

McCarthy's work is informed by his Italian-American heritage (McCarthy's mother was Italian, his father Irish American)  and his hard-luck upbringing in the blue-collar factory town of Endicott, New York (an experience that reverberates in his autobiographical book of poems Shoetown). The Amazon blurb for his book Trouble Light quotes the author's comment that his sketches of Italy, in that book, "are not pastoral poems of the landscape, but poems about memory and the connectedness of historical experience."

His poetry, fiction, and criticism have appeared in New Letters, TriQuarterly, America, Beloit Poetry Journal, Ohio Review, RATTLE magazine, Ploughshares, Poet Lore, Nimrod, Carrying the Darkness, From Both Sides Now, A New Geography of Poets, Unaccustomed Mercy: Soldier Poets of The Vietnam War, Asheville Poetry Review, and other magazines and anthologies.

Critical reception

Critics have focused on the carefully observed detail in McCarthy's writing, his use of concrete, haiku-like images to communicate keen insight and deep feeling in a few terse words. As well, they've noted his depth of feeling for working-class people, prisoners, and other marginalized members of society, and the quiet authority of his critique of the Vietnam war---of all wars.

In a Pedestal magazine review of Trouble Light, critic JoSelle Vanderhooft wrote, Review of Trouble Light

"Each of these poems bristles with immediate, lively imagery and detail---the father’s hands 'not curled or shaking,/ but thick, articulate,' the father 'half believing his own lie' as he daydreams about the might-have-beens of a lost son’s future. [...] [McCarthy's] poems about the rural landscape and his family’s place within it are exquisite...Whether soldier or prisoner, laborer or father, lost son or disenfranchised steel worker, McCarthy’s talent lies in showing the reader the faces behind the pages of his work. His skillful, intricate and deeply literary poetry...is urgent and deeply contemplative."

Amazon reviewer Margot Mifflin observed:
McCarthy's declarative style, sharpened with a jagged edge of irony, keeps Trouble Light free of sentimental indulgence. A poem, for example, about a day of work at Tri-City Beverage in Johnson City, wherever that is, closes with the image of the town arches, inscribed with the words, 'Home of the Square Deal.' A poem set on the Fourth of July ends with the poignant understatement (coming from a vet), 'The noise of fireworks catches me off guard.'

Trouble Light is wistful and precise, suffused with the sensuality of nature, strewn with detritus of industry and haunted by the ghosts of war. Its power lies in its terrific restraint...

Personal life

A former professor of English at St. Thomas Aquinas College, McCarthy lives with his wife Michele and their three sons in Nyack, New York. He has lived and traveled widely in Italy, where he was twice appointed a visiting artist at the American Academy in Rome.

Works 
 http://www.spuytenduyvil.net/door-in-the-wall.html
 Spring Equinox, 2005 (or, The New War Dead)
 The End of the World, etc.
 On a Line by Li Po
 The Caged Bird And The Minotaur: Silence and Politics in the Poetry of Yusef Komunyakaa and Horace Coleman
 Pylon, The New War Dead"
 Attica 1977
 December Rain, Other Voices Poetry
 Flag Burning, Beloit Poetry Journal, Vol. 41, No. 1
 War Story. The Crossing Press, 1977. 
 Shoetown. Cloverdale Library, 1992. 
 Trouble Light. West End Press, 2008. 
  Door in the wall (Spuyten-Duyvil Press, 2020

References

External links 
 Gerald McCarthy, author website

1947 births
Living people
American male poets
St. Thomas Aquinas College faculty
United States Marine Corps personnel of the Vietnam War
American anti-war activists
United States Marines